The 12069 / 12070 RaigarhGondia Jan Shatabdi Express is a Superfast Express train belonging to Indian Railways – South East Central Railway zone that runs between  and  in India.

It operates as train number 12069 from Raigarh to Gondia Junctio} and as train number 12070 in the reverse direction, serving the states of Maharashtra & Chhattisgarh.

Coaches

The 12069 / 70 Raigarh–Gondia Jan Shatabdi Express has 4 AC Chair Car, 13 Second Class seating & 2 Second Jan Chair cum Guard coaches. It does not carry a pantry car.

As is customary with most train services in India, coach composition may be amended at the discretion of Indian Railways depending on demand.

Service

The 12069 / 70 Raigarh–Gondia Jan Shatabdi Express covers the distance of 414 kilometres in 07 hours 00 mins (59.14 km/hr) in both directions.

As the average speed of the train is above , as per Indian Railways rules, its fare includes a Superfast surcharge.

Routeing

Traction

As the entire route is fully electrified, a Bhilai-based WAP-7 locomotive power the train for its entire journey.

Timings

12069 Raigarh–Gondia Jan Shatabdi Express leaves Raigarh every day except Sunday at 06:20 hrs IST and reaches Gondia Junction at 13:25 hrs IST the same day.

12070 Gondia–Raigarh Jan Shatabdi Express leaves Gondia Junction every day except Sunday at 15:00 hrs IST and reaches Raigarh at 22:00 hrs IST the same day.

References 

 http://www.indianrail.gov.in/jan_shatabdi.html
 https://www.youtube.com/watch?v=R4aLrHwkgb8
 http://www.railwayindia.co.in/information/train-type-information/janshatabdi.html
 https://www.flickr.com/photos/railfan_ap/9047993690/

External links

Rail transport in Maharashtra
Rail transport in Chhattisgarh
Jan Shatabdi Express trains